Méréville is a former commune in the Essonne department in Île-de-France in northern France. On 1 January 2019, it was merged into the new commune Le Mérévillois. It contains the Château de Méréville, with its famous 1786 landscape park.

Inhabitants of Méréville are known as Mérévillois.

Geography 

The river Juine flows northward through the eastern part of the commune and crosses the village.

See also 

 Communes of the Essonne department

References

External links 

 Official website 
 

Former communes of Essonne
Populated places disestablished in 2019